The Capitol Christmas Tree (formerly the Capitol Holiday Tree) is the decorated tree that is erected annually on the West Front Lawn of the United States Capitol, in Washington, D.C., to celebrate the Christmas holiday season. The selection, installation, and decoration of the tree are all overseen by the Superintendent of the Capitol Grounds of the Architect of the Capitol (AOC).

The tree is traditionally lit by the Speaker of the United States House of Representatives, joined by a essay contest winner during a ceremony at the beginning of December, and remains lit each night through New Year's Day. By tradition, the President and Vice President of the United States will not attend the tree lighting ceremony.

History
Records of the AOC indicate that a Christmas Tree was purchased in 1919; however, it was not until 1964, one year after the suggestion of John W. McCormack, the 53rd Speaker of the House, that a procedure was established for the installation of a yearly tree.

The 1963 tree was a live Douglas-fir, purchased from a Pennsylvania nursery.  It was re-decorated each year through 1967 when it was severely damaged in a wind storm and subsequently died as a result of root damage.  After the 1963 tree died, white pines from Maryland were cut down and put on display for the 1968 and 1969 seasons. Beginning in 1970, trees have been provided by the U.S. Forest Service from various National Forests.

In the late 1990s, the Capitol Christmas Tree was renamed to the Capitol Holiday Tree. There was never a clear explanation as to why the name change occurred, but the name change raised controversy. On November 29, 2005, the day after the 2005 tree arrived from New Mexico, the tree was renamed the Capitol Christmas Tree at the request of Dennis Hastert, the 59th Speaker of the House.

Traditionally, The tree is lit following a 5 second countdown and the tree lighting ceremony has been followed by the playing of O Christmas Tree.

Trees

Gallery

See also
White House Christmas tree
National Christmas Tree (United States)
Rockefeller Center Christmas Tree
Vatican Christmas Tree
List of individual trees

References

United States Capitol grounds
Individual Christmas trees
Recurring events established in 1963
1963 establishments in Washington, D.C.
Christmas in Washington, D.C.
Individual trees in the District of Columbia